Rakel Dögg Bragadóttir (born 24 May 1986) is an Icelandic former handball player and a former member of the Icelandic national team.

She last played for Stjarnan in October 2017 in the Úrvalsdeild kvenna when she received a blow to the head and suffered a concussion. She had previously retired in 2014 due to similar head injuries but later returned to the court.

In April 2018, Rakel was hired as the co-head coach of Stjarnan, along with Sebastian Alexandersson. She is now the current head coach is for Stjarnan, since March 2020.

References

1986 births
Living people
Rakel Dogg Bragadottir
21st-century Icelandic women